Moinabad-e Bala (also Romanized as Mo‘īnābād-e Bālā; also known as Mo‘īnābād-e ‘Olyā) is a village in Tabadkan Rural District, in the Central District of Mashhad County, Razavi Khorasan Province, Iran. At the 2006 census, its population was 459, in 119 families.

References 

Populated places in Mashhad County